Miami has one of the largest and most prominent LGBTQ communities in the United States. Miami has had a gay nightlife scene as early as the 1930s. Miami has a current status as a gay mecca that attracts more than 1 million LGBT visitors a year. The Miami area as a whole has been gay-friendly for decades and is one of the few places where the LGBTQ community has its own chamber of commerce, the Miami-Dade Gay and Lesbian Chamber of Commerce (MDGLCC). As of 2005, Miami was home to an estimated 15,277 self-identifying gay and bisexual individuals. The Miami metropolitan area had an estimated 183,346 self-identifying LGBT residents.

History

Miami Beach Police targeting claims
In 2009, the American Civil Liberties Union (ACLU) began looking into instances of Miami Beach Police Department (MBPD) targeting gay men for harassment. In February 2010, the ACLU announced that it will sue the City of Miami Beach for an ongoing targeting and arrests of gay men in public.  According to the ACLU, Miami Beach police have a history of arresting gay men for simply looking "too gay".

The incidents between gay men and MBPD resulted in negative publicity for the city. At the meeting with the local gay leaders, Miami Beach Police Chief Carlos Noriega claimed that the incidents were isolated, and promised increased diversity training for police officers. He also announced that a captain, who is a lesbian, would soon be reassigned to Internal Affairs to handle complaints about cops accused of harassing gays. Some members of the committee were skeptical of Noriega's assertion that the recent case wasn't indicative of a larger problem in the MBPD, and provided examples of other cases.

Demographics and economy

Population and concentration
As of 2006, the Williams Institute estimates that Miami has 15,777 LGBT individuals within city boundaries and 183,346 in the Greater Miami area.

There are an estimated 5,131 married same-sex couples in Miami as of 2015, according to a 2018 study of joint tax filings by the Tax Policy Center. This number represents 0.92% of all marriages.

Gay villages

Miami Beach

After decades of economic and social decline, an influx of gays and lesbians moving to South Beach in the late-1980s to mid-1990s led to Miami Beach's revitalization. The newcomers purchased and restored dilapidated Art Deco hotels and clubs, started numerous businesses, and built political power in city and county government. Miami Beach is currently considered by many to be a Gay Mecca because of how LGBTQ friendly the city is and how many events the city offers for the community. Miami Beach is home to numerous gay bars and gay-specific events, and five service and resource organizations.

Strife in the 2000s
As South Beach became more popular as a national and international tourist destination, there have been occasional clashes between cultures and disputes about whether South Beach is as "gay-friendly" as it once was. Some instances of Miami Beach Police brutality against gay men have been at odds with Miami Beach's longstanding image as a welcoming place for gay people.

Modern history
The passage of progressive civil rights laws, election of outspokenly pro-gay Miami Beach Mayor Matti Bower, and the introduction of Miami Beach's Gay Pride Celebration, have reinvigorated the local LGBT community in recent years, which some argued had experienced a decline in the late 2000s.

In 2008, the new Miami Beach Mayor Matti Bower created a Gay Business Development Ad Hoc Committee, with a mission to bring recommendations to the Mayor and City Commission on initiatives to be implemented and supported by the city regarding a variety of issues to ensure the welfare and future of the Miami Beach LGBT community.

In January 2010, Miami Beach passed a revised Human Rights Ordinance that strengthens enforcement of already existing human rights laws and adds protections for transgender people, making Miami Beach's human rights laws some of the most progressive in the state. Both residents of, and visitors to, Miami Beach have been able to register as domestic partners since 2004; in 2008 this benefit was extended to all of Miami-Dade County.

In 2010, the Miami-Dade Gay & Lesbian Chamber of Commerce, with support from the City of Miami Beach, opened an LGBT Visitor Center at Miami Beach's Old City Hall.

In 2014, Miami Beach scored higher this year than any other U.S. municipality for LGBT inclusiveness, according to a 2014 report released by HRC, the nation's largest LGBT-rights group.

Sizzle Miami was a major black gay pride event held in the Miami area between 2002 and 2022 every Memorial Day Weekend.  Although the event catered primarily to black gay men, it was inclusive of everyone.

Miami Beach is home to some of the country's largest fundraisers that benefit both local and national LGBT nonprofits. , some of the largest LGBT events in Miami Beach are:
 Miami Beach Pride
 The Winter Party
 The White Party
Aqua Girl
Celebrate Orgullo
 The Miami Recognition Dinner
 The OutShine Film Festival

Miami
Miami has a strong historical connection to numerous ethnic communities from various regions throughout the world who call Miami home. Through activism and the arts, the LGBTQ community in Miami has a long track record of leading restoration and revitalization efforts in several of Miami's historic communities.  As a city in Miami-Dade County, Miami is able to benefit from a county-wide Human Rights Ordinance that promotes fairness and equal opportunity in employment, housing, public accommodations, credit and financing practices, family leave and domestic violence leave. Discrimination based on race, color, religion, ancestry, national origin, pregnancy, age, disability, marital status, familial status, veteran status, source of income, sexual orientation and gender identity or expression is illegal. The City of Miami also has a ban in place against so-called Conversion Therapy.

Little Havana
The Miami neighborhood of "Little Havana" is the spiritual and cultural core of Miami's Hispanic community, and is home to many Cuban Americans, as well as Americans immigrating from Central and South America.   , the largest Hispanic LGBTQ festival headquartered in Little Havana is:

 The Gay8 Festival

Wilton Manors 

Wilton Manors is known as The Island City, because it is entirely surrounded by water, and is its own municipality within Broward County, Florida.
It is home to a sizable LGBT population as well as winter vacationers, who frequent its many nightclubs and gay-owned businesses along the main street, Wilton Drive; the 2010 U.S. Census reported that it is second only to Provincetown, Massachusetts in the proportion (15%) of gay couples relative to the total population (couples as reported to the U.S. Census). It contains a large Pride center, the World AIDS Museum and Educational Center, and a branch of the Stonewall National Museum & Archives. The mayor, Gary Resnick, refers on his official biography to his male partner.

The city web page highlights LGBT life in Wilton Manors, stating that "the City of Wilton Manors Police Department conducts police training that is geared toward working with the City’s LGBT population and has gay and lesbian officers amongst its ranks." All members of the city commission are LGBT, with the exception of Vice Mayor Scott Newton.

Organizations and community institutions
SAVE and its education arm, the SAVE Foundation, help raise awareness about rights and protections for people of all sexual orientations and gender identities. The SAVE Action PAC endorses local and statewide candidates seeking office who support its goals. Through this process, it educates candidates about the issues affecting the LGBTQ community. It is located at 4500 Biscayne Blvd in the Allapattah neighborhood of Miami.

The Miami-Dade Gay and Lesbian Chamber of Commerce (MDGLCC) is the largest not-for-profit corporation in the county for gay and lesbian businesses. It is located on 1130 Washington Ave. in Miami Beach.

The Pride Center at Equality Park is a non-profit LGBT community center located at 2040 North Dixie Highway, in Wilton Manors, Florida.

The Stonewall National Museum and Archives (SNMA) is a nonprofit, tax-exempt organization that promotes understanding through preserving and sharing the culture of lesbian, gay, bisexual and transgender people and their role in society. The Stonewall Museum Gallery is located at 2157 Wilton Drive in Wilton Manors. The Stonewall Library & Archives is located at 1300 East Sunrise Blvd. in Fort Lauderdale.

Culture and recreation

Miami Beach Pride

The annual Miami Beach Pride is a week long event in Miami. The Pride Parade, Pride Festival, and the beach party are the main events of Pride Week in Miami Beach Pride. While being a gay mecca of the 1980s and 1990s, Miami Beach never had a city-sanctioned Gay Pride Parade until April 2009. With strong support from the newly elected mayor Matti Bower, Miami Beach had its first Gay Pride Festival in April 2009. It is now an annual event.

It has also attracted many celebrities such as Chaz Bono, Adam Lambert, Gloria Estefan, Mario Lopez, and Elvis Duran who were Grand Marshals for Pride weekend from 2012 through 2016 respectively.

The 2010 Pride drew tens of thousands of people.  In 2013 there were more than 80,000 people who participated in the event. There are over 125 businesses who are LGBT supportive that sponsor Miami Beach Pride.

At the 2015 Pride Festival, the city decided to commemorate two gay "Legacy couples" who have been together for more than 50 years. The two couples Frank Petrole and Mark Rudick who have been together for 55 years and Mary Maguire and Jackie Emmett who have been together for 53 years.

Miami Beach Pride celebrated its 10th annual Gay Pride Festival in 2018, an event that continues to draw over 130,000 people every year. Over 125 LGBT-friendly vendors participate in the festivities along with various celebrities.

OutShine Film Festival 
The OutShine Film Festival is an LGBTQ international film festival taking place each April in Miami and each October in Ft. Lauderdale featuring high caliber first-run international films and cultural driven events.  The OutShine Film Festival has grown to include eight days of films and features an "Angel's Award" that honors individuals who dedicate their time and energy promoting LGBTQ film arts.

Gay8 "Ocho" Festival 
A pivotal event in redefining the Little Havana urban enclave is the annual Gay8 Festival, the largest Hispanic LGBTQ festival in the United States.  Starting with its inception in 2015, the Gay8 Festival attracts more than 60,000 attendees annually. The festival celebrates diversity and inclusion combining art, a curated food section, curated booth vendors, several themed dance parties, a doggie village, free films at the historic Tower Theatre and cultural arts into one gigantic party in the heart of Miami's historic Little Havana neighborhood. The festival is instrumental in balancing historic preservation with economic development, promoting tourism and investment, and celebrating diversity and inclusion by connecting LGBTQ and other diverse communities throughout South Florida.  The Gay8 Festival's 4Ward Gala "Pa'lante Awards" is designed to bring awareness to social justice issues and celebrates individuals spearheading social causes.  The Gay8 Festival features an LGBTQ Human Rights Symposium aimed at bringing thought leaders from South Florida, other parts of the United States, Canada, the Caribbean and Latin America together for education and human rights advocacy for the Pan-American region.

See also

 LGBT history in Florida
 LGBT rights in Florida
 LGBT Americans
 LGBT rights in the United States
 South Florida Gay News
 Miami demographics
 I Am Jazz
 Flava Works
 Same-sex marriage in Florida
SAVE
 A Celebration of Friends
 Southern Comfort Conference

References

External links
 Miami-Dade Gay and Lesbian Chamber of Commerce

 
Demographics of Florida